La otra imagen is a 1973 Spanish film directed by Antoni Ribas. It was entered into the 1973 Cannes Film Festival.

Cast
 Asunción Balaguer
 Jorge Bofill
 Miquel Bordoy
 Marta Flores
 Fernando García Ulloa
 Antonio Lara
 Julián Mateos
 Jeannine Mestre
 Francisco Rabal

References

External links

1973 films
Spanish romance films
1970s Spanish-language films
Films directed by Antoni Ribas
1970s Spanish films
1970s romance films